Roberto Antonio Marrufo Torres (born 13 December 1949) is a Mexican politician affiliated with the Institutional Revolutionary Party. As of 2014 he served as Deputy of the LIX Legislature of the Mexican Congress representing Jalisco.

References

1949 births
Living people
Politicians from Guadalajara, Jalisco
Institutional Revolutionary Party politicians
University of Guadalajara alumni
Academic staff of the University of Guadalajara
21st-century Mexican politicians
Deputies of the LIX Legislature of Mexico
Members of the Chamber of Deputies (Mexico) for Jalisco